Tiffanie Ward (born February 5, 1984 in Hacienda Heights, California, United States), is an American light heavyweight/165 lbs female boxer, who competed in the 2010 USA Boxing National Championship.

Amateur career
Ward competed in the 2010 USA Boxing National Championships, and was the bronze medallist.

References

External links

GirlBoxing.org

Columbian.com
MyBoxingFans.com

AZcentral.com

1984 births
Living people
American women boxers
Boxers from California
People from Hacienda Heights, California
Light-heavyweight boxers
21st-century American women